Ian Warner (born May 15, 1990) is a Canadian track athlete specializing in the 100 metres. Born in Toronto, Ontario, he is the younger brother of Justyn Warner.

On June 30, 2012, he finished second behind his brother on 100 meters at the 2012 Nationals Track & Field Championships in Calgary. He competed at the 2012 Summer Olympics in the Men's 4 x 100 metres relay event with his brother Justin.

Statistics

Personal bests

Competition record

References 

1990 births
Athletes from Toronto
Athletes (track and field) at the 2012 Summer Olympics
Black Canadian track and field athletes
Canadian male sprinters
Living people
Olympic track and field athletes of Canada